Agency Valley Dam (National ID # OR00589) is a dam in Oregon, United States, built on the North Fork Malheur River in the eastern part of the state, immediately north of the small town of Beulah in Malheur County.  The dam impounds the river to create Beulah Reservoir.

The dam is an earthen facility, 110 foot high, with a reservoir capacity of 59,200 acre-feet.  This was an irrigation and water-control project of the United States Bureau of Reclamation completed in 1935; no hydroelectric power is generated here.

When full the Beulah Reservoir covers about 2000 surface acres.  Compared to the other two reservoirs in the area's Vale Project, Warm Springs Reservoir and Bully Creek Reservoir, Beulah provides the best opportunities for recreation:  camping, fishing, powerboating and water-skiing.

References 

Dams in Oregon
United States Bureau of Reclamation dams
Reservoirs in Oregon
Lakes of Malheur County, Oregon
Dams completed in 1935
1935 establishments in Oregon